Thuli–Moswa Dam is the name for a proposed reservoir on the Thuli River, south of Gwanda, Zimbabwe with a capacity of 419 million cubic metres.

References

Thuli River
Dams in Zimbabwe
Shashe River
Proposed infrastructure in Zimbabwe
Proposed dams